John Stalker Chillas (born 31 July 1951) is a Scottish professional golfer. He won the Scottish PGA Championship twice, in 1976 and 2001. He has also won three times on the European Seniors Tour. He tied for 52nd place in the 1984 Open Championship.

His best season on the Seniors Tour was 2004 when, in addition to winning the end-of-season Estoril Seniors Tour Championship, he was runner-up 5 times and third on two other occasions. From late August to late September he was runner-up in 4 successive tournaments, the Charles Church Scottish Seniors Open, the Bovis Lend Lease European Senior Masters, The Daily Telegraph Turismo Andaluz European Seniors Match Play Championship and the ADT English Seniors Open. He finished the season third in the order of merit.

Professional wins (6)

Other wins (3)
1976 Scottish Professional Championship
1986 Dumfries Octocentenary Classic
2001 Scottish PGA Championship

European Senior Tour wins (3)

European Senior Tour playoff record (1–0)

Team appearances
PGA Cup (representing Great Britain and Ireland/Europe): 1982, 1983 (winners), 1984 (winners), 1988, 1992
UBS Cup (representing the Rest of the World): 2004

References

External links

Scottish male golfers
European Senior Tour golfers
Sportspeople from Aberdeen
1951 births
Living people